Count Palatine William of Birkenfeld-Gelnhausen (4 January 1701 in Gelnhausen – 25 December 1760 in The Hague) was a titular Count Palatine of Zweibrücken-Birkenfeld and an Imperial Field Marshal.

Life 
William was the youngest son of the Count Palatine John Charles of Gelnhausen (1638–1704) from his second marriage, Esther Maria (1665–1725), a daughter of George Frederick, Baron Witzleben of Elgersburg.

William served from 1729 in the Austrian army and was wounded during the Battle of Mollwitz.  In 1742, he won a victory against the French general Bouffleur and drove the French from Tein.  In 1743, he became General of the Cavalry in the Dutch army.  In 1754, he accompanied Emperor Francis I to his coronation in Frankfurt.  In the same year, he became imperial field marshal.  In 1757 he was appointed governor of Namur.

References 
 Jean Baptiste Ladvocat: Neues historisches Hand-Lexikon, Stettin, 1800, p. 229 f
 Johann Samuel Ersch: Allgemeine Encyklopädie der Wissenschaften und Künste: in alphabetischer Folge, section 2: H - N, part 21: Johann (Infant von Castilien) - Johann-Boniten, p. 189

House of Wittelsbach
Counts Palatine of the Holy Roman Empire
1701 births
1760 deaths
18th-century German people
Generals of the Holy Roman Empire
Sons of monarchs